George L. Aiken (December 19, 1830April 27, 1876) was a 19th-century American playwright and actor best known for writing the most popular of the numerous stage adaptations of Harriet Beecher Stowe's Uncle Tom's Cabin.

Aiken was a writer of dime novels before he turned to theatre. He became an actor in the troupe of his cousin George C. Howard. In 1852, shortly after the publication of Stowe's Uncle Tom's Cabin, Aiken wrote his stage adaptation. It was performed by Howard's company, with Aiken playing the hero George Harris. The play became a spectacular success. His other works include a dramatization of Ann S. Stephens' novel The Old Homestead. He retired from the stage in 1867.

Aiken's original manuscripts for Uncle Tom's Cabin were passed through the family along with other memorabilia from Howard's company. The family placed the collection at the Harry Ransom Center in 1963.

References

Who Was Who in America, Historical Volume, 1607-1896. Chicago: Marquis Who's Who, 1963.

External links

Uncle Tom's Cabin Play Text of Uncle Tom's Cabin
George C. Howard and Family Collection at the Harry Ransom Center, University of Texas at Austin

1830 births
1876 deaths
American male stage actors
19th-century American male actors
19th-century American dramatists and playwrights
Dime novelists